Alnespirone (S-20,499) is a selective 5-HT1A receptor full agonist of the azapirone chemical class. It has antidepressant and anxiolytic effects.

See also 
 8-OH-DPAT
 Azapirone

References 

Serotonin receptor agonists
Imides
Resorcinol ethers
Amines
Azapirones
Chromanes
Lactams
Cyclopentanes
Cyclic ethers
2-Phenoxyethanamines
Propyl compounds